A content discovery platform is an implemented software recommendation platform which uses recommender system tools. It utilizes user metadata in order to discover and recommend appropriate content, whilst reducing ongoing maintenance and development costs. A content discovery platform delivers personalized content to websites, mobile devices and set-top boxes. A large range of content discovery platforms currently exist for various forms of content ranging from news articles and academic journal articles to television. As operators compete to be the gateway to home entertainment, personalized television is a key service differentiator. Academic content discovery has recently become another area of interest, with several companies being established to help academic researchers keep up to date with relevant academic content and serendipitously discover new content.

Methodology
To provide and recommend content, a search algorithm is used within a content discovery platform to provide keyword-related search results. User personalization and recommendation are tools that are used in the determination of appropriate content. Recommendations are either based on a single article or show, a particular academic field or genre of TV, or a full user profile. Bespoke analysis can also be undertaken to understand specific requirements relating to user behaviour and activity.

A variety of algorithms can be used:
 Collaborative filtering of different users' behaviour, preferences, and ratings.
 Automatic content analysis and extraction of common patterns.
 Social recommendations based on personal choices from other people.

Academic content discovery

An emerging market for content discovery platforms is academic content.  Approximately 6000 academic journal articles are published daily, making it increasingly difficult for researchers to balance time management with staying up to date with relevant research. Though traditional tools academic search tools such as Google Scholar or PubMed provide a readily accessible database of journal articles, content recommendation in these cases are performed in a 'linear' fashion, with users setting 'alarms' for new publications based on keywords, journals or particular authors.

Google Scholar provides an 'Updates' tool that suggests articles by using a statistical model that takes a researchers' authorized paper and citations as input. Whilst these recommendations have been noted to be extremely good, this poses a problem with early career researchers which may be lacking a sufficient body of work to produce accurate recommendations.

Television
As the connected television landscape continues to evolve, search and recommendation are seen as having an even more pivotal role in the discovery of content. With broadband-connected devices, consumers are projected to have access to content from linear broadcast sources as well as internet television. Therefore, there is a risk that the market could become fragmented, leaving it to the viewer to visit various locations and find what they want to watch in a way that is time-consuming and complicated for them. By using a search and recommendation engine, viewers are provided with a central 'portal' from which to discover content from several sources in just one location.

See also
 Filter bubble
 Information filtering system
 Information explosion

References

Search engine software
Internet terminology
Recommender systems